Adam's Hit Parade is an EP by Adam Faith, released in December 1960. The EP is a 7-inch vinyl record and released in mono with the catalogue number Parlophone Company, Ltd. GEP 8811.   Adams Hit Parade has the distinction of being the UK's number-one EP on three occasions.  It first reached the number on spot on December 17, 1960, but was bumped out a week later by Cliff Richard and The Shadows's Cliff's Silver Discs.  On January 21, 1961 Faith reclaimed the top spot, only to be evicted a week later by the Shadows' The Shadows (EP) EP which held the top slot until Faith regained it for a week on May 27, 1961.

Faith is backed by John Barry and His Orchestra.

Track listing
Side A
" What Do You Want (Vandyke), a #1 in the UK
" Poor Me (Vandyke), also a #1 in the UK

Side B
 Someone Else's Baby (Vandyke-Ford) #2 in the UK
 Johnny Comes Marching Home'' (from the film Never Let Go) (trad. arr. Barry-Maitland), reached #5 in the UK.

None of these songs charted in the United States.

References

1960 debut EPs
Parlophone EPs
Adam Faith albums